Vieille-Brioude (literally Old Brioude) is a commune in the Haute-Loire department in south-central France.

Geography
The Senouire forms part of the commune's northeastern border, and then flows into the Allier, which flows north through the commune.

Population

Personalities
 Pierre de Vieille-Brioude

See also
Pont de Vieille-Brioude
Communes of the Haute-Loire department

References

Communes of Haute-Loire